Winthrop Marston "Robbie" Robinson (September 5, 1902 – July 29, 1982) was an American college football player and insurance salesman.

Early years
While he played at UF he was said to be from Mobile, Alabama.

University of Florida
Robinson was a prominent tackle for the Florida Gators of the University of Florida from 1921 to 1923.

1922
The first time the Gators ever traveled to the East, Harvard subs overwhelmed Florida 24 to 0 in front of the largest crowd yet to see the Gators play. Despite the loss, Robinson, "who at times stood Harvard's backs on their heads," played well. "Robinson and Duncan  stood out all afternoon."

1923
He was the captain of the 1923 team which upset the Alabama Crimson Tide on Thanksgiving Day 16 to 6. On that game he said, "Psychology did the trick and turned the  tables on the Crimson, for the word went the rounds on the campus that "they can't do it"'–referring to Alabama's chances of walking on the Florida team. He also remarked on the many goal line stands by Florida. Robinson was selected All-Southern in 1923.

References

American football tackles
Florida Gators football players
All-Southern college football players
Players of American football from Alabama
Sportspeople from Mobile, Alabama
1902 births
1982 deaths